The Inca dove or Mexican dove (Columbina inca) is a small New World dove. The species was first described by French surgeon and naturalist René Lesson in 1847. The Inca dove has an average wingspan of 28.5 cm and a max wingspan of 32 cm. It is a slender species, with a gray-brown body covered in feathers that resemble a scaled pattern. The tail is long and square and edged with white feathers that may flare out in flight. The underwings are reddish, like other ground doves, and upon takeoff, the wings produce a distinctive, quiet rattling noise.

Distribution and habitat

The Inca dove ranges from Costa Rica in the south to the American Southwest in the north and is often common to abundant in suitable habitat. Its range has been expanding northward and southward the past few decades. Despite being named after the Inca Empire, this species does not occur in any of the lands that once constituted that empire.  Inca doves are expanding their range in the north and south.  This terrestrial species forms flocks in deserts, scrublands and cultivated areas and may also be found in urban settings where they feed upon grass seeds and take advantage of the ready availability of water from agricultural and suburban irrigation.

The Inca dove has escaped or been deliberately released in the US state of Florida, but there is no evidence that the population is breeding and may only persist due to continuing releases or escapes.

Nesting
Inca doves build their nests primarily in trees and shrubs. The average diameter is about 5 centimeters. The male gathers nesting material and presents it to the female, who also gathers some nesting material. The nest is composed of twigs, grass, weed stalks, and leaves and becomes reinforced with the brood's excrement. The nest is often used over and over, with one nest being reused 11 times.

Behavior

During winter, Inca doves roost in communal huddles in a pyramid formation that aid in heat conservation. These pyramids can contain up to 12 birds. They often flock outside their territories, with flocks going up to 100 birds.

Voice
The song, a forceful cooing rendered variously as cowl-coo or POO-pup, may be given from a tree, wire, or other open, high perch such as a television aerial.

References

External links

 Inca dove - Columbina inca - USGS Patuxent Bird Identification InfoCenter
 
 
 
 

Inca dove
Native birds of the Southwestern United States
Birds of Central America
Inca dove
Inca dove